San Teodoro is a 6th-century church in Rome. It was dedicated to Theodore of Amasea and given to the Eastern Orthodox community of Rome by Pope John Paul II in 2004. It is located on an ancient road between the Roman Forum and Forum Boarium, along the north-western foot of the Palatine Hill.

History

Catholic church 
It may first have been built as early as the 6th century in the ruins of the granaries of Agrippa. The unusual round shape suggests it may have been built into the ruined shell of a temple similar in construction to the well-preserved nymphaeum once identified as the Temple of Minerva Medica. An ancient pagan altar was placed in the atrium in front of the church, and an early Christian mosaic was found on the site. The apsis mosaic dates to the 6th century and shows Christ (in purple clothing with gold lati clavi, which on Roman garments indicated high rank) seated on an orb representing the heavens, flanked by Peter and Paul and by the two martyrs Theodore (a later addition, from Nicholas V's restoration) and Cleonicus.

The church is also traditionally one of the seven original deaconries in Rome, being assigned to a deacon by Pope Agatho (ca. 678), though the first titular deacon known by name was Roberto, ca. 1073, who died before 1099. 

There is no definitive evidence of the church's existence before the 9th century. As the dedication to an eastern saint suggests, this places it in a period of strong Byzantine influence in Rome.  It was rebuilt under Pope Nicholas V, had its long-held titular church status suppressed by Pope Sixtus V, was renovated by Francesco Barberini in 1643, and rebuilt and given to the Society of the Sacred Heart of Jesus by Pope Clement XI and his architect Carlo Fontana in 1703–1705.

Its titulus was reestablished on 2 December 1959 by Pope John XXIII, with William Theodore Heard (1959–1970, pro hac vice presbyterial titular 1970–1973). The last titular of the church was Vincenzo Fagiolo, who died on 22 September 2000.

Orthodox church

Pope John Paul II announced in November 2000 that he was granting the Ecumenical Patriarchate of Constantinople and the Greek Orthodox community in Rome use of the church, with the official inauguration taking place on 1 July 2004, presided over by Ecumenical Patriarch Bartholomew I of Constantinople.

Interior 
At the back of the atrium, outside the church, is an ossuary with stacked skulls and bones, visible through a grille. The Capitoline Wolf was kept in this church until the 16th century.

See also
 History of medieval Arabic and Western European domes
 History of Italian Renaissance domes
 History of early modern period domes

Sources

External links
GCatholic, Cardinal Deaconry S. Teodoro (Suppressed); retrieved: 4 February 2022.

Round churches
National churches in Rome
Titular churches
Eastern Orthodox church buildings in Italy
6th-century churches
Byzantine sacred architecture
Teodoro